Canadian Whites were World War II-era comic books published in Canada that featured colour covers with black-and-white interiors.  Notable characters include Nelvana of the Northern Lights, Johnny Canuck, Brok Windsor, and Canada Jack.  The period has been called the Golden Age of Canadian comics.

Background

For the most part, the "Whites" had colour covers with interiors printed in black ink on white paper, although there was a handful of comics with colour interiors. They proliferated in Canada after the War Exchange Conservation Act restricted the importation of non-essential goods from the United States into Canada, including fiction periodicals.

Four companies took advantage of the situation by publishing comics in Canada, sometimes using imported scripts.  Anglo-American Publishing of Toronto  and Maple Leaf Publishing in Vancouver started publishing in March 1941. Later, two other Toronto-based publishers joined in: Hillborough Studios that August, and Bell Features (originally Commercial Signs of Canada) in September.

Some of the more notable "Whites" creators included Ed Furness, Ted McCall, Adrian Dingle, Gerald Lazare, Jon St. Ables, Fred Kelly, and Leo Bachle, all of whom would later be inducted into the Joe Shuster Award's Canadian Comic Book Creator Hall of Fame.

This period has been called the Golden Age of Canadian comics, but the age of the "Whites" did not last long.  When the trade restrictions were lifted following World War II, comic books from the United States were once again able to flow across the border.

Influence
The 2014 documentary "Lost Heroes: The Untold Story of Canadian Superheroes" began by covering this era.

See also

 Golden Age of Comic Books

Notes

References

Further reading

External links
 CBC video on the history of "Canadian Whites"

History of Canadian comics
Comics industry
Golden Age of Comic Books